Eyþór Ingi Gunnlaugsson (born 29 May 1989 in Dalvík), transliterated/also known as Eythor Ingi, is an Icelandic singer, songwriter, producer, actor, and musician, known for solo material bands called Eldberg, Todmobile and Rock Paper Sisters, represented Iceland in the Eurovision Song Contest 2013 in Malmö, Sweden with the song "Ég á líf" after winning Söngvakeppnin 2013.

At age 15, he played in the Icelandic version of the musical "Oliver!", and in 2008 won the TV talent show "Bandið hans Bubba". after previously having won a song contest for high school students 2007, in which he sang the Deep Purple song "Perfect Strangers". His musical influences are Jeff Buckley, The Beatles, Led Zeppelin and David Bowie.

He is the founder of the band Eldberg. In 2010, joined reactivated band Todmobile with which released the album "7". In 2011, he was nominated for Gríman theatrical Awards for his role as Riff Raff in "The Rocky Horror Picture Show" and a year later appeared in "Les Misérables". In 2013, he was elected to represent Iceland at the Eurovision Song Contest 2013 with the song "Ég á Líf".  In 2013, along with a band Atómskáldin released album "Eyþór Ingi og Atómskáldin".
He is founder, lead vocalist, guitar player and one of the songwriters in Rock Paper Sisters.

First single was released in 2018 when they released their first song “Howling Fool” which has been heard on the 
radio quite often through the summer. The band is one of many that has been founded in a party but one of few or maybe the only one that actually met, practiced, recorded and 
played live. Their first live show was at the notorious stadium “Laugardalshöllin” opening up for Billy Idol. The band is currently working on their first album which will be released 
in 2021. The band has released five singles, "Howling Fool" “Wings” “New Role , “Restless” and the most recent one “Thad a ad Gefa bornum  braud” (2020) a Christmas song based on an old Icelandic folk Christmas tune. 
the band is loaded with experience. Jonbi the drummer, founded the legendary Icelandic stoner rock band Brain Police

He has worked with various musicians from around the world including Steve Hackett from Genesis and Jon Anderson from Yes. Eythor performed on Steve Hackett´s solo album and has been a member of the legendary 80´s prog band Todmobile since 2009 as one of two lead singers. 

Thordur the keyboard player has worked with various musicians around Iceland and for his young age, he has a lot of experience in working as a choir conductor and as a church organist. Thordur has been in a number of bands in all kind of genres including jazz and hip hop. Thordur studied church organ at the Lutheran Church Music school and graduated with a cantors diploma in 2007. Steini the bass player has been performing since he was a teenager and has performed with a number of bands in Iceland. He is a member of some metal bands including ONI and is a frontman in the stoner/desert rock band Volcanova and has done some tours on the mainland and released albums with his bands.

In 2009, he has also become the new lead singer of the Icelandic progressive rock supergroup Todmobile. The band had been formed as a trio in the early 1990s around Þorvaldur Bjarni Þorvaldsson, a renowned vocalist, guitarist, and record producer in Iceland and throughout the years had seen many changes in line-up and revivals and comebacks. Eyþór Ingi took over singing duties from rocker Eyþór Arnalds.

In 2014, he became part of the voice cast for the Icelandic dub for the DreamWorks film How to Train Your Dragon 2.

Personal life
In July 2013, Eyþór Ingi married his longtime girlfriend Soffía Ósk Guðmundsdóttir. They have two daughters named Elva Marín and Anna Carmen together, in addition to Soffía's two daughters from a previous relationship. The couple met in 2008.

His parents are Gunnlaugur Antonsson, a fisherman, and Guðbjörg Stefánsdóttir, a housewife and student. He has two younger sisters, Ellen Ýr and Elísa Rún. He lists his grandfathers Anton Gunnlaugsson and Stefán Friðgeirsson, who were also musicians, as musical influences. His first idol was Elvis Presley, and he recalls imitating him in bad English as a child. He is a fan of Deep Purple

Discography

Albums
 2010: Eldberg (jointly with Eldberg)
 2011: 7 (jointly with Todmobile)
 2013: Eyþór Ingi og Atómskáldin (jointly with Atómskáldin)
 2014: Úlfur (jointly with Todmobile)
 2015: Þar er Heimur Hugans (jointly with Eldberg)
 2016: Alfheims Edge (original soundtrack) (jointly with Matthias Stefanson)
 2016: Á Tónleikum í Tjarnarbíó (jointly with Eldberg)
 2018: Hermaur (Best of Todmobile) (jointly with Todmobile)

EPs
 2012: Ég á líf: The Malmö Album

Singles

Special releases
2013: Ég á líf (Club Mix) (10-track single)

References

Eythor Ingi Gunnlaugsson
Eythor Ingi Gunnlaugsson
Eurovision Song Contest entrants of 2013
1989 births
Living people
Articles containing video clips
Folk-pop singers